The Apertura 2022 Liga MX final phase was being played between 8 October and 30 October 2022. A total of twelve teams were competing in the final phase to decide the champions of the Apertura 2022 Liga MX season. For the fifth straight season, an additional qualifying round, the reclassification or repechaje, was employed, which expanded the number of playoff spots to twelve.

Both finalists qualified to the 2024 CONCACAF Champions League.

Due to the 2022 FIFA World Cup being held in November and December, the Apertura 2022 regular season and final phase began earlier than previous seasons. As a result, the final was held on 30 October 2022 and not in the middle of December.

Pachuca defeated Toluca 8–2 on aggregate to win their seventh league title. As winners, Pachuca will face the Clausura 2023 champion in the 2023 Campeón de Campeones.

Qualified teams
The following teams qualified for the championship stage.

In the following tables, the number of appearances, last appearance, and previous best result count only those in the short tournament era starting from Invierno 1996 (not counting those in the long tournament era from 1943–44 to 1995–96).

Format

Reclassification
All rounds will be played in a single game hosted by the higher seed
If a game ends in a draw, it will proceed directly to a penalty shoot-out.

Liguilla
Teams were re-seeded each round.
The winners of the Reclassification matches were seeded based on their ranking in the classification table.
Team with more goals on aggregate after two matches advanced.
No away goals rule was applied in neither round, if the two teams were tied on aggregate, the higher seeded team advanced.
In the final, if the two teams were tied after both legs, the match went to extra time and, if necessary, a shoot-out.
Both finalists qualified to the 2024 CONCACAF Champions League.

Reclassification

Summary
Matches took place on 8–9 October 2022.

|}

Matches

Seeding
The following is the final seeding for the final phase. The winners of the Reclassification matches were seeded based on their position in the classification table.

Bracket

Quarter-finals

Summary
The first legs were played on 12–13 October, and the second legs were played on 15–16 October.

|}

Matches
First leg

Second leg

Monterrey won 3–0 on aggregate.

América won 11–2 on aggregate.

Toluca won 6–4 on aggregate.

2–2 on aggregate. Pachuca advanced due to being the higher seed in the classification table.

Semi-finals

Summary
The first legs were played on 19–20 October, and the second legs were played on 22–23 October.

|}

Matches
First leg

Second leg

Toluca won 3–2 on aggregate.

Pachuca won 6–2 on aggregate.

Finals

Summary
The first leg was played on 27 October, and the second leg will be played on 30 October.

|}

First leg

Details

Statistics

Second leg

Pachuca won 8–2 on aggregate.

Details

Statistics

Statistics

Goalscorers

Assists

Notes

References

 
1
Liga MX seasons